On Record is a 1917 American silent crime drama film starring Mae Murray and directed by Murray's then-husband Robert Z. Leonard. Based on a story by John B. Clymer and Paul West, the film's scenario was written by George D. Proctor. On Record was produced by Jesse Lasky's production company, Jesse L. Lasky Feature Play Company and was distributed by Paramount Pictures. The film's status is currently unknown.

Cast
 Mae Murray - Helen Wayne
 Tom Forman - Rand Calder
 Lucien Littlefield - ?
 Henry A. Barrows - Martin Ingleton
 Charles Ogle - Frederick Manson
 Louis Morrison - Detective Dunn
 Bliss Chevalier - Mrs. Calder
 Gertrude Maitland - Mary Ingleton
 Mrs. Lewis McCord (uncredited)
Jane Wolfe (uncredited)

References

External links
 
 
  lobby poster

1917 films
1917 crime films
American crime drama films
American silent feature films
American black-and-white films
Films directed by Robert Z. Leonard
Paramount Pictures films
1917 crime drama films
1910s American films
Silent American drama films